Homoeosoma soaltheirellum is a species of snout moth in the genus Homoeosoma. It was described by Roesler in 1965 from Soaltheira, Portugal, from which its species epithet is derived. It has also been recorded from Spain.

References

Moths described in 1965
Phycitini